Formica suecica is a species of ant belonging to the family Formicidae.

It is native to Northern Europe.

References

suecica
Insects described in 1902